Val Paul (April 10, 1886 – March 23, 1962) was an American actor and director of the silent era. He appeared in 99 films between 1913 and 1922.  He also directed 10 films between 1920 and 1932. He was born in Denver, Colorado and died in Hollywood, California.

Selected filmography

 Suspense (1913)
 The Secret of the Swamp (1916)
 It Happened in Honolulu (1916)
 God's Crucible (1917)
 Mutiny (1917)
 The Lair of the Wolf (1917)
 Mr. Logan, U.S.A. (1918)
 Treat 'Em Rough (1919)
 Smiles (1919)
 The Girl from Nowhere (1919)
 Sundown Slim (1920 - directed)
 West Is West (1920 - directed)
 Hearts Up (1921 - directed)
 The Kickback (1922 - directed)
 The Timber Queen (1922)
 Good Men and True (1922 - directed)
 Canyon of the Fools (1923 - directed)
 Crashin' Thru (1923 - directed)
 Desert Driven (1923 - directed)
 The Miracle Baby (1923 - directed)

External links

1886 births
1962 deaths
American male film actors
American male silent film actors
American film directors
Male actors from Denver
20th-century American male actors